A total solar eclipse occurred on November 2, 1967. A solar eclipse occurs when the Moon passes between Earth and the Sun, thereby totally or partly obscuring the image of the Sun for a viewer on Earth. A total solar eclipse occurs when the Moon's apparent diameter is larger than the Sun's, blocking all direct sunlight, turning day into darkness. Totality occurs in a narrow path across Earth's surface, with the partial solar eclipse visible over a surrounding region thousands of kilometres wide.

This total eclipse was very unusual in that it was NON-CENTRAL and did NOT have a central line nor a southern path limit. Instead, over half of the umbral shadow fell off into space throughout the eclipse. Gamma had a value of −1.0007.

This was the first of 55 umbral solar eclipses of Solar Saros 152. The 1st was in 1967 and the 55th will be in 2941. The total duration is 974 years.

Related eclipses

Solar eclipses of 1964–1967

Notes

References

1967 11 2
1967 in science
1967 11 2
November 1967 events